Allan Hopkins Dorans (born 30 July 1955) is a Scottish National Party (SNP) politician who has served as the Member of Parliament (MP) for Ayr, Carrick and Cumnock since the 2019 general election. He is the vice dean of Ayr Guildry. Dorans was made a Companion of the Institute of Personnel and Development (CIPD) in 1990 and a member of the Chartered Management Institute (MCMI) in 2000.

Early life and career
Dorans was born in Dailly, South Ayrshire, the son of Peter Dorans DCM and Agnes Dorans. He is the youngest of nine children. He was educated at Carrick Academy, Maybole, the Open University and the University of the West of Scotland, gaining a diploma in public service leadership.

He joined the Metropolitan Police and reached the rank of detective inspector by the age of 28, serving with the force from 1972 to 1987. During that time he was a uniform response officer as a constable, sergeant and inspector. He also served as a detective in the rank of constable, sergeant and inspector, specialising in the investigation of the most serious crimes of rape, robbery and murder. He completed his career in the Metropolitan Police as an instructor at the Detective Training School at Hendon.   The following year, he became a Personnel and Training Executive at the Rank Organisation, remaining there until 2000. From 2002 to 2003, he was a substitute teacher at Cape Elizabeth High School in Maine. Dorans was an area manager for the West of Scotland with SACRO, a leading Scottish community safety charity from 2003 to 2009. He was also managing director of  West of Scotland Mediation Services from 2009 to 2013. 
Mr Dorans has been a lifelong volunteer and has volunteered as a befriender for those suffering from mental health issues, a school board member at Belmont Academy, a volunteer at Ayr Hospital, a volunteer counsellor with the Ayrshire Council on Alcohol supporting those experiencing problems with alcohol,a prolific volunteer fund raiser for Cancer Research UK by undertaking challenging events including the New York Marathon , trekking in the Andes mountains to reach Machu Picchu and trekking to the peak of Mount Kilimanjaro. For the last 20 years he has volunteered with Voluntary Action South Ayrshire (VASA) as a trustee and a Christmas Day volunteer providing Christmas dinner for the elderly and isolated elderly members of the community. He has also served as a director of VASA for many years and served for several years as the chair of the board of directors of that organisation. In 2020 he was inducted as an inaugural member of the Carrick Academy Hall of Fame.

Political career
Dorans was first elected to South Ayrshire Council in 2012 for the SNP in Ayr West ward, then appointed in 2014 as SNP Group Leader; but he was defeated in 2017. He was selected as an SNP candidate in October 2019. On 12 December 2019, he was elected as the Member of Parliament for Ayr, Carrick and Cumnock, gaining the seat from the Conservatives. He was appointed as the Shadow SNP Spokesperson for Policing on 10 February 2021. He is a member of the Standards Committee, Privileges Committee and the European Scrutiny Committee.

He is a leading campaigner for “Justice for Yvonne”, which is a campaign led by his former police colleague, John Murray, to bring to justice those responsible for the murder of WPC Yvonne Fletcher, who was shot in the back and murdered outside the Libyan Peoples Bureau on 17 April 1984. Dorans raised the issue at Prime Minister's Questions in July 2020. On 22 February 2022 Dorans secured and led an adjournment debate on that subject in the House of Commons. On 7th December 2022 he again raised the subject of the murder of WPC Fletcher at Prime Ministers Questions with the recently elected Prime Minister, Rishi Sunak, who has agreed to meet with him to see how this matter may be taken forward.

Personal life 
In 1979, he married Maureen Beeson; the couple have a son. He lists his recreations as trekking and "undertaking challenging events to raise funds for charitable causes".

References

External links

Living people
Scottish National Party MPs
UK MPs 2019–present
Scottish National Party councillors
Scottish police officers
Metropolitan Police officers
People from South Ayrshire
1955 births